¿Quién quiere ser millonario? (English translation: Who wants to be a millionaire?) is a Panamanian game show based on the original British format of Who Wants to Be a Millionaire?. The show is hosted by Atenógenes Rodríguez. The main goal of the game is to win US$100,000 by answering 15 multiple-choice questions correctly. There are three lifelines – fifty fifty, phone a friend and ask the audience . ¿Quién quiere ser millonario? is broadcast from 2009 to 2011. It is shown on the Panamanian TV station Telemetro. When a contestant gets the fifth question correct, he leaves with at least $1,000 When a contestant gets the tenth question correct, he leaves with at least $8,000

The game's prizes

References

Who Wants to Be a Millionaire?
2000s Panamanian television series
2009 Panamanian television series debuts
2011 Panamanian television series endings
Telemetro original programming